Seeliger is a relatively small lunar impact crater that lies near the southeastern edge of Sinus Medii. It was named after the German astronomer Hugo von Seeliger. This is a circular, cup-shaped feature that has not been appreciably worn by impact erosion. To the southeast is a rille named the Rima Réaumur, following a line to the northwest. In the north is the 110-km-long Rima Oppolzer, which divides the mare where Seeliger is situated from the remainder of the Sinus Medii.

Satellite craters

By convention these features are identified on lunar maps by placing the letter on the side of the crater midpoint that is closest to Seeliger.

References

External links
Seeliger at The Moon Wiki

Impact craters on the Moon